Yamsk is a rural locality (a selo) and a port in Olsky District of Magadan Oblast, Russia, located some  east of Magadan, the administrative center of the oblast.

Geography
Yamsk is located by the mouth of the Yama in the Perevolochny estuary, separated by a sandspit from Yam Bay at the southwestern end of Shelikhov Gulf, in the northeastern part of the Sea of Okhotsk.

References

Rural localities in Magadan Oblast